Roughly Obsess & Destroy (abbreviated in writing as RO&D, spoken as R.O.D.) was a professional wrestling stable founded in 2003 in All Japan Pro Wrestling by Taka Michinoku, and later reformed in Pro Wrestling Noah as a tag team consisting of former members D'Lo Brown and Buchanan.

History
RO&D began in AJPW in mid-2003 as heels, often clashing with the likes of Keiji Mutoh. Taka Michinoku was the only Japanese member of RO&D, with all the rest being gaijins (foreigners). Some experts do not consider Taiyō Kea to be gaijin, despite the fact that he is Hawaiian, because he trained in the AJPW dojo and has spent nearly all of his career in the promotion. Later, RO&D became faces and feuded against the Voodoo Murders. At one point, they held almost all the titles in AJPW (see championships and accomplishments).

Later, members of the stable would rejoin in NOAH, with D'Lo Brown and Buchanan capturing the GHC Tag Team Championship on one occasion.

Members 
Taka Michinoku
Taiyō Kea
D'Lo Brown
Buchanan
Jamal
Rico Constantino
The Gladiator
Gigantes
Justin Credible
Matt Morgan
RO'Z
KAZMA
Masahiro Chono (one-night member)
PSYCHO (honorary member)
BLUE-K (honorary member)

Championships and accomplishments
All Japan Pro Wrestling
All Asia Tag Team Championship (1 time) - Buchanan and Rico Constantino
Triple Crown Heavyweight Championship (1 time) - Taiyō Kea
World Junior Heavyweight Championship (1 time) - Taka Michinoku
World Tag Team Championship (1 time) - Taiyō Kea and Jamal
Champion Carnival (2006) - Taiyō Kea
World's Strongest Tag Determination League (2004) - Taiyō Kea and Jamal
January 2 Korakuen Hall Heavyweight Battle Royal (2004) - Jamal 
Hawai'i Championship Wrestling
HCW Kekaulike Heritage Tag Team Championship (1 time) – Taiyō Kea and Jamal
Kaientai Dojo
Strongest-K Championship (1 time) - Taka Michinoku
FMW/WEW Hardcore Tag Team Championship (1 time) – Taka Michinoku with Tomo Michinoku
Michinoku Pro Wrestling
Tohoku Junior Heavyweight Championship (1 time) - Taka Michinoku
Pro Wrestling Noah
GHC Tag Team Championship (1 Time) - D'Lo Brown and Buchanan
Global Tag League Technique Prize (2008, 2009)- D'Lo Brown and Buchanan
Tokyo Sports
Technique Prize (2005) - Taka Michinoku

References

All Japan Pro Wrestling teams and stables
Pro Wrestling Noah teams and stables